Julian Stanczak (November 5, 1928 – March 25, 2017) was a Polish-born American painter and printmaker who was one of the central figures in the development of Op art movement. The artist lived and worked in Seven Hills, Ohio with his wife, the sculptor Barbara Stanczak.

Biography 
Julian Stanczak was born in Borownica, Poland in 1928.  At the beginning of World War II, Stanczak was forced into a Siberian labor camp, where he permanently lost the use of his right arm. He had been right-handed.  In 1942, aged thirteen, Stanczak escaped from Siberia to join the Anders' Army in Persia.  After deserting from the army, he spent his teenage years in a hut in a Polish refugee camp in Uganda.  In Africa, Stanczak learned to write and paint left-handed.  He then spent some years in London, before moving to the United States in 1950. He settled in Cleveland, Ohio. He became a United States citizen in 1957, taught at the Art Academy of Cincinnati for 7 years.

In 2007, Stanczak was interviewed by Brian Sherwin for Myartspace. During the interview, Stanczak recalled his experiences with war and the loss of his right arm and how both influenced his art. Stanczak explained, "The transition from using my left hand as my right, main hand, was very difficult. My youthful experiences with the atrocities of the Second World War are with me,- but I wanted to forget them and live a "normal" life and adapt into society more fully. In the search for Art, you have to separate what is emotional and what is logical. I did not want to be bombarded daily by the past,- I looked for anonymity of actions through non-referential, abstract art."

Education
Stanczak received his Bachelor of Fine Arts degree from the Cleveland Institute of Art, Cleveland Ohio in 1954, and then trained under Josef Albers and Conrad Marca-Relli at the Yale University, School of Art and Architecture where he received his Master of Fine Arts in 1956.

Works
The term op art was coined by the art critic working for Time magazine in response to the exhibition Julian Stanczak: Optical Paintings held at the Martha Jackson Gallery in New York in 1964. His work was later included in the Museum of Modern Art's 1965 exhibition The Responsive Eye, which helped establish Op art as a movement. In 1966 he was named a "New Talent" by Art in America magazine. In the early 1960s he began to make the surface plane of the painting vibrate through his use of wavy lines and contrasting colors in works such as Provocative Current  (1965).  These paintings gave way to more complex compositions constructed with geometric rigidity yet softened with varying degrees of color transparency such as Netted Green (1972).

In addition to being an artist, Stanczak was also a teacher, having worked at the Art Academy of Cincinnati from 1957–64 and as Professor of Painting, at the Cleveland Institute of Art, 1964-1995.  He was named "Outstanding American Educator" by the Educators of America in 1970.

Style
Stanczak deployed repeating forms to create compositions that are manifestations of his visual experiences.  Stanczak's work is an art of experience, and is based upon structures of color.  In the 1980s and 1990s Stanczak retained his geometric structure and created compositions with bright or muted colors, often creating pieces in a series such as Soft Continuum (1981; Johnson and Johnson Co. CT, see McClelland pl. 50). More recently, Stanczak created large-scale series, consisting of square panels upon which he examined variations of hue and chroma in illusionistic color modulations, an example of which is Windows to the Past (2000; 50 panels).

Public Collections
Ackland Art Museum, University of North Carolina, Chapel Hill, North Carolina
Akron Art Museum, Akron, Ohio
Albright-Knox Art Gallery, Buffalo, New York
Allentown Art Museum, Allentown, Pennsylvania
American University Museum, Washington, DC
Art Academy of Cincinnati, Cincinnati, Ohio
Art Gallery of Greater Victoria, British Columbia, Canada
Art Gallery of Ontario, Toronto, Canada
Art Institute of Chicago, Chicago, Illinois 
Art Museum of South Texas, Corpus Christi, Texas
Asheville Art Museum, Asheville, North Carolina
Baum Gallery of Art, University of Central Arkansas, Conway, Arkansas 
Blanton Museum of Art, University of Texas, Austin, Texas
Birmingham Museum of Art, Birmingham, Alabama
Binghamton University Art Museum, Binghamton, New York
Boca Raton Museum of Art, Boca Raton, Florida
Brooklyn Museum, Brooklyn, New York
Bryn Mawr College, Bryn Mawr, Pennsylvania
Burchfield Penney Art Center, SUNY Buffalo State, Buffalo, New York
Butler Institute of American Art, Youngstown, Ohio
Canton Museum of Art, Canton, Ohio
Cantor Arts Center, Stanford University, Palo Alto, California
Carnegie Museum of Art, Pittsburgh, Pennsylvania
Case Western Reserve University, Cleveland, Ohio
Cincinnati Art Museum, Cincinnati, Ohio
Cleveland Institute of Art, Cleveland, Ohio
Cleveland Museum of Art, Cleveland, Ohio
Columbus Museum of Art, Columbus, Ohio
Cranbrook Art Museum, Bloomfield Hills, Michigan
Crystal Bridges Museum of American Art, Bentonville, Arkansas
Dallas Museum of Art, Dallas, Texas
David Owsley Museum of Art, Ball State University, Muncie, Indiana
Dayton Art Institute, Dayton, Ohio
Dennos Museum Center, Traverse City, Michigan 
Detroit Institute of Arts, Detroit, Michigan 
Eli and Edythe Broad Art Museum, Michigan State University, East Lansing, Michigan
Fine Arts Museums of San Francisco, San Francisco, California
Flint Institute of Arts, Flint, Michigan
Fort Wayne Museum of Art, Fort Wayne, Indiana
Frederick R. Weisman Museum of Art, Pepperdine University, Malibu, California
Galeria Studio, Centrum Sztuki Studio im Stanislawa I. Witkiewicza, Warsaw, Poland
Hirshhorn Museum and Sculpture Garden, Smithsonian Institution, Washington, DC
Hood Museum of Art, Dartmouth College, Hanover, New Hampshire
Housatonic Museum of Art, Bridgeport, Connecticut
Indianapolis Museum of Art, Indianapolis, Indiana
Johnson Museum of Art, Cornell University, Ithaca, New York
Kalamazoo Institute of Arts, Kalamazoo, Michigan
Kemper Museum of Contemporary Art, Kansas City, Missouri
Kennedy Museum of Art, Ohio University, Athens, Ohio 
Kent State University, School of Art Collection and Galleries, Kent, Ohio
Krannert Art Museum, University of Illinois, Champaign, Illinois
La Salle University Art Museum, Philadelphia, Pennsylvania
Los Angeles County Museum of Art, Los Angeles, California
Lowe Art Museum, University of Miami, Coral Gables, Florida
Masur Museum of Art, Monroe, Louisiana
McNay Art Museum, San Antonio, Texas
Metropolitan Museum of Art, New York, NY
Miami Dade College, Museum of Art + Design, Miami, Florida
Miami University Art Museum, Oxford, Ohio
Milwaukee Art Museum, Milwaukee Wisconsin
Mint Museum of Art, Charlotte, North Carolina
MIT List Visual Arts Center, Cambridge, Massachusetts
Montclair Art Museum, Montclair, New Jersey
Muscarelle Museum of Art, The College of William and Mary, Williamsburg, Virginia
Museo de Arte Contemporaneo de Buenos Aires, Buenos Aires, Argentina 
Museo Rufino Tamayo, Museo de Arte Contemporaneo, Mexico City, Mexico
Museum of Fine Arts, Boston, Massachusetts
Museum of Fine Arts, Houston, Texas
Museum of Modern Art, New York, New York
Muskegon Museum of Art, Muskegon, Michigan
National Gallery of Art, Smithsonian Institution, Washington, DC
Neuberger Museum of Art, Purchase College, State University of New York, Purchase, New York
New Orleans Museum of Art, New Orleans, Louisiana
North Carolina Museum of Art, Raleigh, North Carolina
Norton Museum of Art, West Palm Beach, Florida
Oklahoma City Museum of Art, Oklahoma City, Oklahoma
Orange County Museum of Art, Newport Beach, California
Orlando Museum of Art, Orlando, Florida
Pennsylvania Academy of Fine Arts, Philadelphia, Pennsylvania
Philadelphia Museum of Art, Philadelphia, Pennsylvania
Phoenix Art Museum, Phoenix, Arizona
Portland Art Museum, Portland, Oregon
Portland Museum of Art, Portland, Maine
Princeton University Art Museum, Princeton, New Jersey
Reese Bullen Gallery, Humboldt State University, Arcata, California
Rhode Island School of Design Museum, Providence, Rhode Island
San Francisco Museum of Modern Art, San Francisco, California
Scottsdale Museum of Contemporary Art, Scottsdale, Arizona
Smith College Museum of Art, Northampton, Massachusetts
Smithsonian American Art Museum, Washington, DC
Snite Museum of Art, University of Notre Dame, Southbend, Indiana
South Dakota Art Museum, South Dakota State University, Brookings, South Dakota
Speed Art Museum, Louisville, Kentucky
Springfield Museum of Art, Springfield, Ohio
Toledo Museum of Art, Toledo, Ohio
Tucson Museum of Art, Tucson, Arizona
University at Buffalo Art Gallery, State University of New York at Buffalo, Buffalo, New York
University of Iowa College of Dentistry, Iowa City, Iowa
University of Michigan–Dearborn, Alfred Berkowitz Gallery, Dearborn, Michigan
University of Michigan Museum of Art, Ann Arbor, Michigan
University of Michigan, Ann Arbor, Michigan 
Utah Museum of Fine Arts, University of Utah, Salt Lake City, Utah
Wake Forest University Fine Arts Gallery, Winston-Salem, North Carolina
Washington State University, Museum of Art, Pullman, Washington
Weisman Art Museum, University of Minnesota, Minneapolis, Minnesota
Westmoreland Museum of American Art, Greensburg, Pennsylvania
Winnipeg Art Gallery, Winnipeg, Manitoba, Canada
Worcester Art Museum, Worcester, Massachusetts

Bibliography
Arnheim, Rudolf, Harry Rand and Robert Bertholf.  Julian Stanczak:  Decades of Light (University of Buffalo, Poetry and Rare Book Collection, 1990)
McClelland, Elizabeth.  Julian Stanczak, Retrospective:  1948-1998 (Butler Institute of American Art, 1998)
Serigraphs and Drawings of Julian Stanczak 1970-1972 (exh. cat. by Gene Baro, Corcoran Gallery of Art, 1972)
Julian Stanczak:  Color = Form (exh. cat. by Jacqueline Shinners and Rudolf Arnheim, Dennos Museum Center, Northwestern Michigan College, 1993)

References

External links
Julian Stanczak
Julian Stanczak interviewed by Brian Sherwin- myartspace.com
Geoform: An Interview with Artist Julian Stanczak, 2011

1928 births
2017 deaths
20th-century Polish painters
20th-century Polish male artists
21st-century Polish painters
21st-century male artists
Polish printmakers
Modern printmakers
Polish emigrants to the United States
20th-century American painters
American male painters
21st-century American painters
American printmakers
Art Academy of Cincinnati faculty
Op art
People from Seven Hills, Ohio
Polish male painters